Out There and Back is the third studio album by Paul van Dyk. It was released in 2000 and is the first album released on his own Vandit record label. It can be seen as Paul van Dyk's breakthrough album. Several editions include a bonus CD.

The album is partially inspired by the science fiction film Contact (1997). The track "Another Way" would later be featured during a chase sequence of an episode from What's New, Scooby-Doo?.

Track listing

Charts

References

External links 
 

2000 albums
Deviant Records albums
Mute Records albums
Paul van Dyk albums
Vandit albums